Bombardiere was one of nineteen s built for the  (Royal Italian Navy) in the late 1930s and early 1940s. Completed in mid-1942, she was part of the second batch of seven ships.

Design and description
The Soldati-class destroyers were slightly improved versions of the preceding . Their wartime complement during was 206 officers and enlisted men.

Bombardiere was powered by two Belluzzo geared steam turbines, each driving one propeller shaft using steam supplied by three Yarrow boilers.

Bombardieres main battery consisted of five 50-caliber  guns in two twin-gun turrets, one each fore and aft of the superstructure and the fifth gun was mounted on a platform amidships. Anti-aircraft (AA) defense for the second-batch Soldatis was provided by eight to twelve  Breda Model 1935 guns. The ships were equipped with six  torpedo tubes in two triple mounts amidships. Although they were not provided with a sonar system for anti-submarine work, they were fitted with one or two pairs of depth charge throwers. The ships could carry 48 mines.

Citations

Bibliography

External links
 Bombardiere Marina Militare website

Soldati-class destroyers
Ships built in Livorno
1942 ships
World War II destroyers of Italy
Maritime incidents in January 1943